Aydin Senkut is an American investor, serial entrepreneur and executive, who is managing partner of Silicon Valley venture capital firm Felicis Ventures. Earlier in his career, he was Google's first product manager.

Education and early life 
As an undergraduate, Senkut attended Boston University's Questrom School of Business, graduating in 1992 with a bachelor's degree in Business Administration.

Career 
After graduating from Questrom, Senkut spent some brief time in Swiss healthcare company Hoffmann-La Roche's finance department, before attending graduate school where he earned an MBA at the University of Pennsylvania's Wharton School of Business, and an MA in finance from the University of Pennsylvania College of Arts & Sciences.  After graduation, he joined high-performance computer manufacturer Silicon Graphics (now SGI) as a business development manager, before going to Google.

Google
In 1999, Senkut joined Google, when the company reportedly only had 62 employees. He served as Google's first product manager, managing the launch of its first 10 international sites, its first online search licensing products and its first SafeSearch. Later as Google's first international sales manager, he was responsible for world-wide licensing deals. He left Google in 2005, after making tens of millions of dollars exercising his stock options after the company's 2004 initial public offering.

Felicis Ventures
After taking some time off to travel, Senkut began getting calls from companies about investing in and advising them, and decided to become a venture capitalist. In 2006, he founded Felicis Ventures. By 2007, with himself as the only employee, he'd already invested in 15 companies, with an average investment of $50,000.

His investment strategy was originally to be a super angel investor, and he changed into a multi-stage investor. Some of his investment successes included exits with fintech firm Credit Karma and real estate marketplace Opendoor, as well as early investments in Shopify and Fitbit.

In 2014, Senkut received media coverage for having Felicis sign a pledge supporting the founders of the companies they invested with, giving up the right to vote against them.

Honors and recognition 
From 2016 through 2019, the NY Times named Senkut to its list of the top 20 venture capitalists.

Senkut has been named to Forbes Magazine's Midas List of top investors from 2014 through 2021.

Personal life 
Senkut is married to Sonia Arrison and lives in Atherton, California.

References 

American venture capitalists
Boston University alumni
Wharton School of the University of Pennsylvania alumni
Businesspeople from California
Year of birth missing (living people)
Living people